"My Nemesis" is a song by American heavy metal band Five Finger Death Punch, from their sixth studio album Got Your Six. It was released in 2016 as the third single from the album. There is also an official video of the song as well.

Charts

References 

Five Finger Death Punch songs
2016 songs
2016 singles
Reprise Records singles
Song recordings produced by Kevin Churko
Songs written by Kevin Churko
Songs written by Zoltan Bathory
Songs written by Ivan Moody (vocalist)
Songs written by Jason Hook
Songs written by Jeremy Spencer (drummer)